Waldshut may refer to:
Waldshut (district), a county in Baden-Württemberg, Germany
Waldshut-Tiengen, a town in Baden-Württemberg, Germany